The David Stitt Mound is a Native American mound near Chillicothe in Ross County, Ohio, United States.

At some point since white settlement of southern Ohio, the Stitt Mound was excavated by the creation of a tunnel to its center.  While any records produced by the excavators have been lost, it is believed that the excavation was supervised by Ohio Archaeological and Historical Society archaeologist Clarence Loveberry, who undertook multiple such excavations in Ross County in the late 1890s.

Although no artifacts from the Stitt Mound are extant, its shape and location indicate that it is likely a work of the Adena culture, whose mounds were characteristically built for religious or ceremonial purposes.  Because the Adena typically built mounds around log charnel houses, it is possible that bones and evidence of wooden structures are still extant within the mound; consequently, the mound is a potential archaeological site.  In recognition of its archaeological value, the David Stitt Mound was listed on the National Register of Historic Places in 1972.

References

Adena culture
Archaeological sites in Ohio
Archaeological sites on the National Register of Historic Places in Ohio
Geography of Ross County, Ohio
National Register of Historic Places in Ross County, Ohio
Mounds in Ohio